Tomasz Moskal  (born 8 July 1975 in Wrocław) is a retired Polish footballer (striker).

Successes

Polonia Warszawa

1x Polish Champion: (1999/00)
1x Ekstraklasa Cup: (2000)

External links
 

1975 births
Living people
Polish footballers
Polish expatriate footballers
Ekstraklasa players
Śląsk Wrocław players
GKS Katowice players
Polonia Warsaw players
Lechia Gdańsk players
Górnik Polkowice players
GKS Bełchatów players
Jagiellonia Białystok players
Górnik Zabrze players
Odra Wodzisław Śląski players
Sportspeople from Wrocław
Association football forwards
Polish expatriate sportspeople in Greece
Expatriate footballers in Greece